The Girona Synagogue (Hebrew: הבית כנסת של גירונא) (Catalan: Sinagoga de Girona) was an important medieval synagogue in Carrer de Sant Llorenç in Girona, Spain, which served as the centre for early Spanish Kabbalism, with scholars such as Nachmanides, Issac the Blind and Azriel of Girona using the synagogue as a house of learning. The synagogue was built around the 13th century, with large renovations done in the mid 14th century, mostly funded by the Taroç family. Following the Massacre of 1391, the synagogue was desecrated and looted, however in 1415, Ferdinand I of Aragon ordered that the synagogue be restored to the Jews. During the Catalan Civil War the synagogue was partly destroyed, and following the Alhambra Decree of 1492, the synagogue was sold to the canons of Girona Cathedral on the 10th July, 1492 for the price of 300 pounds. Today the site of the synagogue functions as a museum where archaeological finds and documents related to the synagogues of Girona, are displayed.

References 

Museums in Catalonia
Synagogues in Spain
13th-century synagogues